Congleton United Reformed Church is in Antrobus Street, Congleton, Cheshire, England.  It is recorded in the National Heritage List for England as a designated Grade II listed building.

History
The building originated as a Congregational church.  It was designed by William Sugden, an architect from Leek, and built in 1876–77.

Architecture
Constructed in stone, the church has a slate roof.  Its architectural style is Gothic Revival.  The entrance front has a double portal, each doorway having a pointed arch.  At the northeast is a squat octagonal turret.  There is a large west window.  On the gable above it is a large tabernacle surmounted by a ball finial with a long stalk.  The authors of the Buildings of England series state that the church exhibits "astonishingly free handling of the Gothic precedents", and that "everything is richly and individually treated".  Inside the church is a gallery at the east end.  The three-manual organ was made by J. J. Binns for Claremont Baptist Church, Bolton. It was moved here and rebuilt in 1984 by Leonard Reeves.

See also

Listed buildings in Congleton

References

External links
 "Congleton - Congregationalist" at genuki.eu

Grade II listed churches in Cheshire
Churches completed in 1877
Gothic Revival church buildings in England
Gothic Revival architecture in Cheshire
United Reformed churches in England
Congleton
1877 establishments in England